Ken Andrews (born Kenneth Andrew Doty; June 18, 1967) is an American musician, singer-songwriter, and record producer. Andrews was born in Seattle, Washington, and attended film school in Los Angeles before his band Failure received a record deal from Slash Records.

Career
He is best known as co-founder, lead vocalist, guitarist, bassist and co-songwriter of the alternative rock band Failure. He has also played in Replicants, a cover band side project that also included members of Tool. After the breakup of Failure in 1997, he also recorded music under the moniker ON, and later assembled and fronted the band Year of the Rabbit. He has performed as a solo artist, as well as collaborating in a self-described "digital band" called Digital Noise Academy with Justin Meldal-Johnsen, Sharky Laguana (Creeper Lagoon), Jordon Zadorozny, and Charlotte Martin (whom Andrews married in 2005), among others. In 2014, Andrews reunited with Failure members Greg Edwards and Kellii Scott. They embarked on a North American tour, which included two dates performing alongside A Perfect Circle and Puscifer for the celebration of Maynard James Keenan's 50th birthday.

Apart from his work as a musician, Andrews has also produced and/or mixed material for many artists, such as Nine Inch Nails, Beck, Lostprophets, Pete Yorn, A Perfect Circle, Tenacious D, Black Rebel Motorcycle Club, Candlebox, Mae, and others. Also notable is his participation in the production of "You Know My Name", the theme for the 2006 James Bond movie Casino Royale, performed by Soundgarden/ex-Audioslave frontman Chris Cornell.

In March 2007, Andrews released Secrets of the Lost Satellite, his first solo album under his own name, and helped oversee its release via his own label, Dinosaur Fight Records. The initial inspiration for the album came when he was invited by Beck to contribute to songs that he and his backing band were working on for the Nacho Libre soundtrack, recording sessions which Andrews described as "one of the most exciting of my life". Beck's live musical director, session musician Justin Meldal-Johnsen, was already a friend of Andrews', and shortly afterward, they and other members of Beck's band (including Matt Mahaffey of Self) began working on material that eventually became the album. Andrews also brought in another old friend, Jordon Zadorozny of Blinker the Star, to assist with songwriting and arrangements, and Zadorozny also ended up playing various instruments on some songs, as well. Both Meldal-Johnsen and Zadorozny are listed as co-producers of Secrets of the Lost Satellite. Andrews went on tour that spring for the first time since 2003, with the opening band, San Diego's First Wave Hello, also serving as his backing band.

The members of Failure and Tool have been friends since the early 1990s; the two bands toured together repeatedly, and some members collaborated occasionally. Andrews is often credited for directing the music video for Tool's "Hush", but this is incorrect. He did, however, edit the video for their later single "Prison Sex". Andrews is also mistakenly credited with involvement in the post-grunge arena-rock band Neon Steam Dreams; that Andrews is a different musician by the same name.  In May 2014, the Cinquanta concert with Tool, A Perfect Circle and Failure was held as a 50th Birthday Celebration for Maynard James Keenan, who asked for the band to reunite for that concert. Keenan stated, "This was the perfect opportunity to tick off one of my bucket list items in the form of a Failure reunion. What better birthday present could one ever hope for?" Failure, however, performed their first reunion show at the El Rey Theater on February 13, 2014, before the event.

He was featured on an episode of WIRED Science discussing the pros and cons of digital vs. analog recording. Andrews argued that more can be done (with greater ease) with digital while Steve Albini argued that he can accomplish just as much with analog.

On the 28th October 2020, Andrews released a five song EP entitled What's Coming. This was his first release of new solo work since 2007's Secrets of the Lost Satellite. Single track “Sword and Shield” has a music video directed by Andrews, which stars David Dastmalchian. This video is intended as a criticism of U.S. President Donald Trump, opening with a shot of a MAGA drum kit, with Dastmalchian lip syncing to the song dressed as Trump. Andrews himself stated that this was the very first overtly political song he had ever written.

Discography

With Failure
 Comfort (1992)
 Magnified (1994)
 Fantastic Planet (1996)
 Golden (2004)
 Essentials (2006)
 Tree of Stars (Live EP) (2014)
 The Heart Is a Monster (2015)
 In the Future Your Body Will Be The Furthest Thing From Your Mind (2018)
 Wild Type Droid (2021)

With Replicants
 Replicants (1995)

With ON
 Soluble Words – EP (1999)
 Shifting Skin (2000)
 Make Believe (2002)

With Year of the Rabbit
 Hunted (2003)
 Year of the Rabbit (2003)

With Digital Noise Academy
 Synemy (2013)

Solo
 Secrets of the Lost Satellite (2007)
 Secret Things: Remixes from the Lost Satellite – EP (2007)
 Secrets of the Lost Satellite Tour, Spring 2007 – live album (2007)
What's Coming - EP (2020)

Works as a producer or mixing engineer
 Abandoned Pools – Armed to the Teeth
 Anya Marina – Slow & Steady Seduction: Phase II
 Army of Anyone – Army of Anyone
 A Perfect Circle – The Hollow (Acoustic Live From Philly)
 Beck – Nacho Libre
 Beck – Timebomb
 Beto Cuevas – Miedo escénico
 Black Rebel Motorcycle Club – Take Them On, On Your Own
 Blinker the Star – A Bourgeois Kitten
 Blinker the Star – August Everywhere
 Bowery Beasts – Forthcoming
 Bullets and Octane – In the Mouth of the Young
 Charlotte Martin – In Parentheses
 Charlotte Martin – On Your Shore
 Charlotte Martin – Stromata
 Charlotte Martin – Reproductions
 Charlotte Martin – Dancing on Needles
 Charlotte Martin – Water Breaks Stone
 Chris Cornell – You Know My Name
 Citizen - As You Please
 Copeland – In Motion
 Creeper Lagoon – Take Back the Universe and Give Me Yesterday
 Creeper Lagoon – Watering Ghost Garden
 Crosby Loggins – Seriously
 A Day to Remember – Common Courtesy
 Dukatalon - Involuntary Action
 Empyr – The Peaceful Riot
 Failure – Comfort
 Failure – Magnified
 Failure – Fantastic Planet
 Failure – Enjoy the Silence
 Failure – Golden
 Failure – The Heart Is a Monster
Gone is Gone - Echolation
 FM Static – Dear Diary
 Future of Forestry – Twilight
 The Icarus Line – Penance Soiree
 Jamison Parker – Sleepwalker
 Jimmy Eat World – Firestarter
 Jimmy Eat World – Last Christmas
 Jimmy Eat World - Integrity Blues
 Ken Andrews – Secrets of the Lost Satellite
 Ken Andrews – Just Say Yes
 Leaves – Breathe
 Mae – The Everglow
 Molly McGuire – Lime
 Moon Pigeon - "Letters from Thieves" from self titled EP
 Nine Inch Nails – 1,000,000 and Echoplex – Live
 ON – Shifting Skin
 ON – Make Believe
 Paramore – Paramore
 Pete Yorn – For Nancy
 Pete Yorn – Strange Condition
 Pete Yorn – Nightcrawler
 Pete Yorn – Go with It
 Pete Yorn – It Never Rains in Southern California
 Pete Yorn – Day I Forgot
 Replicants – Replicants
 The Republic Tigers – Fight Song
 Ruth – Anorak
 Settle – At Home We Are Tourists
 Skycycle – Breathing Water
 Starflyer 59 – Talking Voice vs. Singing Voice
 Starflyer 59 – My Island
 Stone Temple Pilots − Stone Temple Pilots (2018)
 Tenacious D – Tenacious D
 Tenacious D – The Pick of Destiny
 Thousand Foot Krutch – The Flame in All of Us
 Underoath - Erase Me 
 Unwritten Law – Swan
 Year of the Rabbit – Year of the Rabbit

References

  Also available on Big Hassle, and Ken Andrews' official web site, www.kenandrews.com.

External links 
 Ken Andrews – official site
 Ken Andrews interview at Silent Uproar

1967 births
Record producers from California
American audio engineers
American rock guitarists
American male guitarists
Alternative rock guitarists
American rock singers
Living people
Musicians from Seattle
Replicants (band) members
Singers from Washington (state)
Guitarists from Los Angeles
Guitarists from Washington (state)
20th-century American guitarists
Engineers from California
20th-century American male musicians
The Wondergirls members
Failure (band) members
21st-century American guitarists
21st-century American male singers
21st-century American singers